Juan Bilbao Mintegi, known as Juanín (born 16 September 1900, date of death unknown) was a Spanish professional footballer who played as a defender.

Career
Born in Bilbao, Juanín played for Osasuna and Athletic Bilbao, and was capped twice for Spain.

References

1900 births
Year of death missing
Spanish footballers
Spain international footballers
Athletic Bilbao footballers
Association football defenders
CA Osasuna players
Footballers from Bilbao
La Liga players